Someone like You may refer to:

Film, television, and theatre
Someone like You (film), a 2001 American romantic comedy
Someone like You (2009 film) or Unnaipol Oruvan, an Indian Tamil-language film directed by Chakri Toleti
Someone like You (TV series), a 2015 Taiwanese romantic-comedy melodrama series
Someone like You (musical), a 1989 West End musical

Literature
Someone like You (novel), by Sarah Dessen, 1998
Someone Like You (short story collection), a 1953 book by Roald Dahl

Songs
 "Someone like You" (Adele song), 2011
 "Someone like You" (New Order song), 2001
 "Someone like You" (SafetySuit song), 2008
 "Someone like You" (Sylvester song), 1986
 "Someone like You" (Van Morrison song), 1987
 "Someone like You", by Arthur Louis, 1974
 "Someone like You", by Bang Tango from Psycho Café, 1989
 "Someone like You", by Boys Like Girls from Love Drunk, 2009
 "Someone like You", by Daryl Hall from Three Hearts in the Happy Ending Machine, 1986
 "Someone like You", by Emmylou Harris from Profile II: The Best of Emmylou Harris, 1984
 "Someone like You", by Icehouse from Sidewalk, 1984
 "Someone like You", by Living Colour from Time's Up, 1990
 "Someone like You", by Mac Miller from Watching Movies with the Sound Off, 2013
 "Someone like You", by the Michael Stanley Band from You Can't Fight Fashion, 1983
 "Someone like You", by the Operation M.D. from We Have an Emergency, 2007
 "Someone like You", by Paolo Nutini from Caustic Love, 2014
 "Someone like You", by Russell Watson from The Voice, 2000
 "Someone like You", by the Summer Set from Everything's Fine, 2011
 "Someone like You", from the film My Dream Is Yours, 1949
 "Someone like You", from the stage musical Jekyll & Hyde, 1990

See also
"Somebody Like You", a 2002 song by Keith Urban
"Someone like Me", a 2004 song by Atomic Kitten
Yourself or Someone Like You, a 1996 album by Matchbox Twenty